Pericopsis mooniana, the nandu wood or nedun tree, is a species of legume in the family Fabaceae. It is found in Indonesia, Malaysia, Micronesia, Palau, Papua New Guinea, the Philippines, and Sri Lanka. It is threatened by habitat loss.

References

 Asian Regional Workshop (Conservation & Sustainable Management of Trees, Viet Nam) 1998. Pericopsis mooniana. 2006 IUCN Red List of Threatened Species. Downloaded on 19 July 2007.

Faboideae
Trees of Sri Lanka
Trees of Malesia
Trees of New Guinea
Flora of the Northwestern Pacific
Vulnerable plants
Taxonomy articles created by Polbot